Jérôme Minière  is a French instrumentalist and singer who was born in Orléans, France, and moved to Quebec. He is known for his fictional character Herri Kopter. The name of Herri Kopter appears on three of his albums.

Discography
Monde pour n'importe qui (1997)
La nuit éclaire le jour qui suit 1 (1998)
La nuit éclaire le jour qui suit 2 (1998)
Du Pic au Cœur (2001)
Jérôme Minière présente Herri Kopter (2001)
Petit cosmonaute (2002)
Jérôme Minière chez Herri Kopter (2004)
Herri Kopter au Grand Théâtre (CD + DVD) (2005)
Cœurs (2007)
Le Vrai Le Faux (2010)
Jérome Minière Danse Avec Herri Kopter (2013)

Remixes 
 2002: Laudanum - Honest (Sometimes)
 2004: Martin Leon - Perte de Nord
 2005: Jean-Pierre Ferland - Le petit roi
 2006: Laudanum  - Perfect
 2007: Pierre Lapointe - Deux par deux rassemblés
 2012: Alfa Rococo - Électron Libre
 2013: Montag - Memori

Achievements of albums 
 2006: La fin du monde - Michel Faubert (La Tribu)
 2011: Ngâbo - Ngâbo (La Tribu)
 2013: Grenadine  - Grenadine (R-Musik)
 2014: Quatre - Tristan Malavoy (EP) (Audiogram)
 2015: Bricolages - Domlebo (Domlebo)

References

External links
Herri Kopter's website 

French male singers
1972 births
Living people
French singer-songwriters
Canadian singer-songwriters
Singers from Quebec
21st-century French singers
21st-century Canadian male singers
French-language singers of Canada
Canadian male singer-songwriters